The 2010 Nippon Professional Baseball season is the 61st season since the NPB was reorganized in .

Final standings

Central League

Pacific League

Climax Series

Note: All of the games that are played in the first two rounds of the Climax Series are held at the higher seed's home stadium. The team with the higher regular-season standing also advances if the round ends in a tie.

Central League First Stage

Yomiuri Giants win series 2–0

Central League Final Stage
Chunichi Dragons have one-win advantage

Chunichi Dragons win series 4–1.

Pacific League First Stage

Chiba Lotte Marines win series 2–0

Pacific League Final Stage
Fukuoka SoftBank Hawks have one-win advantage

Chiba Lotte Marines win series 4–3.

Japan Series

Chiba Lotte Marines win series 4–2

League leaders

Central League

Pacific League

See also
2010 Korea Professional Baseball season
2010 Major League Baseball season

References

External links

 (English)